Supernews is a Usenet service provider founded in 1995. It is currently owned by Giganews and currently share the same backbone. Offering consumers and Internet service providers direct access to Usenet, Supernews is one of the oldest Usenet providers today.

Its website is available in English, French, German, and Dutch.

Service
Supernews offers individual users one plan for its Usenet newsgroups service:

Unlimited GB Usenet
Unlimited Speed — 1000 Mbit/s and faster
Servers in North America and Europe
256-Bit SSL Encryption
2273 days of Binary Retention & 4153 days of Text Retention (as of November 5, 2014 with daily increases)
30 Connections
24-Hour Customer Support
Payment methods: Visa, PayPal, MasterCard, Discover, American Express and iDEAL

Retention Updates
March 18, 2010 – to 400 days
August 19, 2010 – to 500 days
January 12, 2011 – to 800 days
July 8, 2011 – to 1,058 days with daily incrementation following.
December 15, 2011 – continuing with the daily incrementation since July 8, 2011 the retention was upgraded to 1,217 days.
 September 5, 2013 – as of this date binary retention is 1,847 days, while text retention is 3,727.
February 29, 2016 - 2357 Days Binary Retention 4634 Days Text Retention

History

1995: Supernews was founded in 1995 by Remarq Communities.
1998: Supernews changed its name to RemarQ Communities in 1998.

2000: Remarq was acquired by Critical Path and changed its name back to Supernews.

2007: SuperNews expands its network and opens a European Data Center in Amsterdam, connecting to the Amsterdam Internet Exchange (AMS-IX).

2010: Supernews accepts Euro payments via iDEAL

References

External links 
 Supernews.com

Telecommunications companies established in 1995
Usenet servers
Internet service providers